Ch'alla Qullu may refer to:

Mountains 
 Ch'alla Qullu (Bolivia-Chile), on the border of Bolivia and Chile
 Ch'alla Qullu (La Paz), in the La Paz Department, Bolivia

Places
 Ch'alla Qullu, Oruro in the El Choro Municipality, Cercado Province, Potosí Department, Bolivia
 Ch'alla Qullu, Potosí in the Potosí Department, Bolivia